Union Church is a historic non-denominational church located  southeast of Oreana in Macon County, Illinois. The white frame church was built in 1876; its design incorporates elements of the Greek Revival and Italianate styles. In addition to religious services, the church also hosted a school, Temperance Union meetings, and Christmas and New Year's parties. The church has a functional pump organ from 1879, which was originally purchased for the Temperance Union. A cemetery is adjacent to the church; its first burial dates to 1842. In 1936, the church's congregation discontinued religious services; since then, the building has been used only for weddings and an annual Memorial Day celebration. The church was added to the National Register of Historic Places on September 23, 1999.

References

Churches on the National Register of Historic Places in Illinois
Greek Revival church buildings in Illinois
Italianate architecture in Illinois
Churches completed in 1876
Buildings and structures in Macon County, Illinois
Wooden churches in Illinois
National Register of Historic Places in Macon County, Illinois
Italianate church buildings in the United States